Spain has participated in all World Championships in Athletics since the beginning in 1983.

Medalists

Medal tables

By championships

By event

Doping
Marta Domínguez finished in first position in the 3000 metres steeplechase in 2009 World Athletics Championship held in Berlin ahead Yuliya Zarudneva from Russia and Milcah Chemos Cheywa of Kenya, but she was disqualified and stripped her gold medal in November 2015 .The Court of Arbitration for Sport found Domínguez guilty of an anti-doping rule violation and ordered that all competitive results obtained by Domínguez from 5 August 2009 be disqualified. .

Stripped medals

Reassigned Medals
Jesús Ángel García Bragado finished in third position in the 50km walk race in the 2009 World Athletics Championship held in Berlin behind Sergey Kirdyapkin of Russia and Trond Nymark of Norway. On January 15, 2015, Kirdyapkin's results were disqualified for doping violations so Jesús Ángel García Bragado was awarded with the silver medal.

Ruth Beitia finished in third position (shared with Anna Chicherova of Russia) in the high jump in the 2013 World Championships held in Moscow behind Svetlana Shkolina of Russia and Brigetta Barrett of the United States. Shkolina was disqualified for doping violation and Ruth Beitia was awarded with the silver medal.

Miguel Ángel López finished in third position in the 20km walk in the 2013 World Championships held in Moscow behind Aleksandr Ivanov of Russia and Chen Ding of the China. Ivanov was disqualified for doping violation and Miguel Ángel López was awarded with the silver medal.

References

External links
 

Nations at the World Athletics Championships